Nora Angela Zehetner (born February 5, 1981) is an American film and television actress.

Early life
Zehetner was born in El Paso, Texas, the daughter of Nancy Lynne (née Nelson) and John Carol Zehetner. She attended elementary school in Richardson, Texas, a suburb of Dallas, before moving back to El Paso. When she was 14 she moved to Dallas where she attended McKinney High School for several years. For one year she also attended the Texas Academy of Mathematics and Science, an early college entrance program at the University of North Texas for students interested in mathematics or science.

Career

At the age of 18, Zehetner started an acting career, something she had been interested in since she was 8, and moved to Los Angeles. She appeared in Tart (2001), American Pie 2 (2001), R.S.V.P. (2002), May (2002), and The Song of Rose (2003), as well as in other films and several TV series and commercials. Zehetner portrayed Laynie Hart on the WB's show Everwood.

In Brick, which won the Special Jury Prize for Originality of Vision at the 2005 Sundance Film Festival, Zehetner plays the femme fatale Laura. The soundtrack CD of this film, released by Lakeshore Records on March 21, 2006, features Zehetner's full, unedited performance of "The Sun Whose Rays Are All Ablaze".

In the thriller-horror film Beneath, Zehetner appears in the leading role of Christy.

Zehetner also starred in NBC's Heroes as Eden McCain. Zap2It.com proclaimed Zehetner one of "The Underrated of 2006" for her role.

Together with the actors and comedians Tom Arnold and Dax Shepard, Zehetner embarked in 2007 on a USO/Armed Forces Entertainment tour to the Persian Gulf region to meet with service members and sign autographs.

In 2007, Zehetner appeared with Marisa Berenson in the short movie "Jalouse: Elegante, famous, beautiful, jolie" which was produced by the French fashion magazine Jalouse to celebrate their 10th anniversary.

Zehetner portrayed the recurring role of Dr. Reed Adamson for 10 episodes during the sixth season (2009–2010) of the television series Grey's Anatomy.

Zehetner portrayed Jen, Marc Maron's girlfriend on the TV series Maron.

In 2018, Zehetner was cast in the recurring role of Valeria Poriskova on the second season of the ABC political drama Designated Survivor.

Nora Zehetner plays Annie Glenn the wife of astronaut John Glenn in the television series The Right Stuff which premiered in October 2020 on Disney+.

Filmography

Film

Television

Music videos
 "Quand Nina est saoule" (2008) – Ours
 "Her Fantasy" (2012) – Matthew Dear

References

External links

 
 

1981 births
Living people
Actresses from El Paso, Texas
American film actresses
American soap opera actresses
American television actresses
People from Richardson, Texas
21st-century American actresses